Cottonwood Canyon State Park, established in 2013, is the second largest state park in Oregon, encompassing  on the lower John Day River.

Park headquarters, about a two-hour drive east of Portland, is adjacent to Oregon Route 206 between Wasco and Condon. The river, which here forms the boundary between Sherman County on the west and Gilliam County on the east, meanders for  through the arid park.

These and the main canyon are flanked by grassland, sagebrush shrub-steppe, river bottom, and cliffs composed mainly of basalts of the Columbia River Basalt Group.

History
In 2008, the Western Rivers Conservancy, a non-profit organization based in Portland, bought the land from a cattle-ranching family, the Murthas, who had owned it since the 1930s. The conservancy was able to borrow money from the Wyss Foundation to make a quick purchase possible. Later, Western Rivers offered to sell the land to the Oregon Parks and Recreation Department (OPRD) to create a state park. OPRD agreed and paid Western Rivers what the non-profit had paid the Murthas, $7.86 million. In 2022, the park applied to become the 2nd IDA Dark Sky Park in the state of Oregon, with approvals expected to come by mid to late 2023.

Recreation
Hiking, camping, fishing, and river rafting are among the recreation possibilities in the park. A campground with 21 primitive sites, 7 sites for hikers and bikers, a group camping area, potable water, and a restroom are near the park headquarters and the information building. In addition, old ranching roads that cross the park double as hiking trails, and an adjacent  of public land managed by the U.S. Bureau of Land Management offer further possibilities for hiking.

Horse trails wind through the Gilliam County segment of the park. The J. S. Burres day-use area, also in the Gilliam County segment, is a put-in place for boaters heading downriver and a take-out place for commercial and private groups running the John Day between Clarno and Route 206. Hunting, subject to Oregon Department of Fish and Wildlife regulations, is allowed in undeveloped parts of the park.

Cottonwood Canyon is also one of the darkest state parks in Oregon, which makes the park ideal for star gazing. The canyon provides an opportunity to stargaze that is hidden from lights from the surrounding areas and adjacent road.

Fauna and flora
In 2010, a small number of California bighorn sheep were transplanted to the park's future location from the nearby Lower Deschutes Wildlife Area; the herd eventually grew into one of Oregon's largest. Rocky Mountain elk, mule deer, pronghorn, coyotes, and many smaller mammals can be found in the area. A variety of snakes (including the western rattlesnake) live in the park, which is also home to several lizard species. Frogs, toads, and waterfowl can be found near the river. Fish in the river include Chinook salmon, steelhead, catfish, carp and smallmouth bass.

Raptors such as American kestrels and Swainson's hawks frequent the area. Game birds such as the chukar partridge and the ring-necked pheasant are found in the uplands, and migratory birds such as Bullock's oriole and the lazuli bunting visit the park in summer.

Balsamroot and monkey flower bloom here in early May. Sagebrush blooms in October. OPRD workers have been planting small numbers of box elder, chokecherry and hawthorn trees to provide shade near park headquarters.

See also

 List of Oregon state parks

References

External links

A rugged new park in Eastern Oregon
Cottonwood Canyon, Oregon's second biggest state park, hums with construction activity

2013 establishments in Oregon
Parks in Gilliam County, Oregon
Parks in Sherman County, Oregon
Protected areas established in 2013
State parks of Oregon